Tempera, also known as egg tempera, is a permanent, fast-drying painting medium consisting of colored pigments mixed with a water-soluble binder medium, usually glutinous material such as egg yolk. Tempera also refers to the paintings done in this medium. Tempera paintings are very long-lasting, and examples from the first century AD still exist. Egg tempera was a primary method of painting until after 1500 when it was superseded by oil painting. A paint consisting of pigment and binder commonly used in the United States as poster paint is also often referred to as "tempera paint", although the binders in this paint are different from traditional tempera paint.

Etymology
The term tempera is derived from the Italian dipingere a tempera ("paint in distemper"), from the Late Latin distemperare ("mix thoroughly").

History

Tempera painting has been found on early Egyptian sarcophagus decorations. Many of the Fayum mummy portraits use tempera, sometimes in combination with encaustic painting with melted wax, the alternative painting technique in the ancient world. It was also used for the murals of the 3rd century Dura-Europos synagogue. 

A related technique has been used also in ancient and early medieval paintings found in several caves and rock-cut temples of India. High-quality art with the help of tempera was created in Bagh Caves between the late 4th and 10th centuries and in the 7th century in Ravan Chhaya rock shelter, Odisha.

The art technique was known from the classical world, where it appears to have taken over from encaustic painting and was the main medium used for panel painting and illuminated manuscripts in the Byzantine world and Medieval and Early Renaissance Europe. Tempera painting was the primary panel painting medium for nearly every painter in the European Medieval and Early renaissance period up to 1500. For example, most surviving panel paintings attributed to Michelangelo are executed in egg tempera, an exception being his Doni Tondo which uses both tempera and oil paint.

Oil paint, which may have originated in Afghanistan between the 5th and 9th centuries and migrated westward in the Middle Ages eventually superseded tempera. Oil replaced tempera as the principal medium used for creating artwork during the 15th century in Early Netherlandish painting in northern Europe. Around 1500, oil paint replaced tempera in Italy. In the 19th and 20th centuries, there were intermittent revivals of tempera technique in Western art, among the Pre-Raphaelites, Social Realists, and others. Tempera painting continues to be used in Greece and Russia where it is the traditional medium for Orthodox icons.

Technique
Tempera is traditionally created by hand-grinding dry powdered pigments into a binding agent or medium, such as egg yolk, milk (in the form of casein) and a variety of plant gums.

Egg tempera
The most common form of classical tempera painting is "egg tempera". For this form most often only the contents of the egg yolk is used. The white of the egg and the membrane of the yolk are discarded (the membrane of the yolk is dangled over a receptacle and punctured to drain off the liquid inside). Egg yolk is rarely used by itself with pigment; it dries almost immediately and can crack when it is dry. Some agent is always added, in variable proportions. One recipe calls for vinegar, but only in small amounts. A few drops of vinegar will preserve the solution for a week. (1:3, 3 parts water, 1 part yolk; other recipes suggest white wine (1 part yolk, 2 parts wine). Some schools of egg tempera use various mixtures of egg yolk and water.

Powdered pigment, or pigment that has been ground in distilled water, is placed onto a palette or bowl and mixed with a roughly equal volume of the binder. Some pigments require slightly more binder, some require less.

When used to paint icons on church walls, liquid myrrh is sometimes added to the mixture to give the paint a pleasing odor, particularly as worshippers may find the egg tempera somewhat pungent for quite some time after completion. The paint mixture has to be constantly adjusted to maintain a balance between a "greasy" and "watery" consistency by adjusting the amount of water and yolk. As tempera dries, the artist will add more water to preserve the consistency and to balance the thickening of the yolk on contact with air. Once prepared, the paint cannot be stored. Egg tempera is water-resistant, but not waterproof. Different preparations use the egg white or the whole egg for a different effect. Other additives such as oil and wax emulsions can modify the medium. Egg tempera is not a flexible paint and requires stiff boards; painting on canvas will cause cracks to form and chips of paint to fall off.

Egg tempera paint should be cured for at least 3 months, up to 6 months. The surface is susceptible to scratches during the curing process, but will become much more durable after curing. Avoid framing egg tempera paintings in glass, as the glass can trap moisture and lead to the growth of mold.

Tempera grassa
Adding oil in no more than a 1:1 ratio with the egg yolk by volume produces a water-soluble medium with many of the color effects of oil paint, although it cannot be painted thickly.

Pigments
Some of the pigments used by medieval painters, such as cinnabar (contains mercury), orpiment (contains arsenic), or lead white (contains lead) are highly toxic. Most artists today use modern synthetic pigments, which are less toxic but have similar color properties to the older pigments. Even so, many (if not most) modern pigments are still dangerous unless certain precautions are taken; these include keeping pigments wet in storage to avoid breathing their dust.

Application
Tempera paint dries rapidly. It is normally applied in thin, semi-opaque or transparent layers. Tempera painting allows for great precision when used with traditional techniques that require the application of numerous small brush strokes applied in a cross-hatching technique. When dry, it produces a smooth matte finish. Because it cannot be applied in thick layers as oil paints can, tempera paintings rarely have the deep color saturation that oil paintings can achieve because it can hold less pigment (lower pigment load). In this respect, the colors of an unvarnished tempera painting resemble a pastel, although the color deepens if a varnish is applied. On the other hand, tempera colors do not change over time, whereas oil paints darken, yellow, and become transparent with age.

Ground

Tempera adheres best to an absorbent ground that has a lower oil content than the tempera binder used (the traditional rule of thumb is "fat over lean", and never the other way around). The ground traditionally used is inflexible Italian gesso, and the substrate is usually rigid as well. Historically wood panels were used as the substrate, and more recently un-tempered masonite or medium density fiberboard (MDF) have been employed; heavy paper is also used.

Pre-made paints
Apart from the traditional process of mixing pigment with egg yolk, new methods include egg tempera sold in tubes by manufacturers such as Sennelier and Daler-Rowney. These paints do contain a slight amount of oil to enhance durability within the container. Notable egg tempera artist and author Koo Schadler points out that because of this addition of oil "tubed 'egg tempera' paints are actually 'tempera grassa', an emulsion of egg yolk and a drying oil (generally with other additives, such as preservatives and stabilizers). Tempera grassa has some of the working properties of both egg tempera and oil painting and is a perfectly viable medium – however it is not the same as pure, homemade egg tempera and behaves differently."Marc Chagall used Sennelier egg tempera tube paints extensively.

Artists
Although tempera has been out of favor since the Late Renaissance and Baroque eras, it has been periodically rediscovered by later artists such as William Blake, the Nazarenes, the Pre-Raphaelites, and Joseph Southall. The 20th century saw a significant revival of tempera. European painters who worked with tempera include Giorgio de Chirico, Otto Dix, Eliot Hodgkin, Pyke Koch, and Pietro Annigoni, who used an emulsion of egg yolks, stand oil and varnish.

Spanish surrealist painter Remedios Varo worked extensively in egg tempera.

Revival in 20th-century American art

The tempera medium was used by American artists such as the Regionalists Andrew Wyeth, Thomas Hart Benton and his students James Duard Marshall and Roger Medearis; expressionists Ben Shahn, Mitchell Siporin and John Langley Howard, magic realists George Tooker, Paul Cadmus, Jared French, Julia Thecla and Louise E. Marianetti, realist painter David Hanna; Art Students League of New York instructors Kenneth Hayes Miller and William C. Palmer, Social Realists Kyra Markham, Isabel Bishop, Reginald Marsh, and Noel Rockmore, Edward Laning, Anton Refregier, Jacob Lawrence, Rudolph F. Zallinger, Robert Vickrey, Peter Hurd, and science fiction artist John Schoenherr, notable as the cover artist of Dune.

20th-century Indian art
In the early part of the 20th century, a large number of Indian artists, notably of the Bengal school took up tempera as one of their primary media of expression. Artists such as Gaganendranath Tagore, Asit Kumar Haldar, Abanindranath Tagore, Nandalal Bose, Kalipada Ghoshal and Sughra Rababi were foremost. After the 1950s, artists such as Jamini Roy and Ganesh Pyne established tempera as a medium for the new age artists of India.

In contemporary art
Other practicing tempera artists include Philip Aziz, Ernst Fuchs, Antonio Roybal, George Huszar, Donald Jackson, Tim Lowly, Altoon Sultan, Shaul Shats, Sandro Chia, Alex Colville, Robert Vickrey, Andrew Wyeth, Andrew Grassie, and Ganesh Pyne.

Gallery

See also 
 Glue-size
 Gold ground

References

Further reading
Altoon Sultan, The Luminous Brush: Painting With Egg Tempera, Watson-Guptill Publications, New York 1999.
Richard J. Boyle, Richard Newman, Hilton Brown: Milk and Eggs: The American Revival of Tempera Painting, 1930-1950 Brandywine River Museum Staff, Akron Art Museum Staff  (0-295-98190-3) Softcover, University of Washington Press
Lara Broecke,'Cennino Cennini's Il Libro dell'Arte: a New English Translation and Commentary with Italian Transcription', Archetype Publications 2015. 
Daniel V. Thompson, Jr., Materials and Techniques of Medieval Painting, Dover: explanation and expansion on Cennini's works
Daniel V. Thompson, Jr. The Practice of Tempera Painting: Materials and Methods, Dover Publications, Inc. 1962..
Chifan C. Alexandru, " Symbol of hand in fine arts", Artes Publication 2013, Iaşi, Romania,

External links

Egg Tempera Painting
The Society of Tempera Painters
Making Egg Tempera
Tempera Paintings on Cloth in England
Egg Tempera Resources
Step-by-step Egg Tempera Technique

Paints
Painting techniques
Visual arts materials
Eggs in culture
Italian words and phrases